Esseiachryson minutum is a species of beetle in the family Cerambycidae, the only species in the genus Esseiachryson.

References

Achrysonini